The Bucharest West Power Station is a large thermal power plant located in Bucharest having 5 generation groups, 4 of 40 MW each commissioned in 1955, and one group of 190 MW commissioned in 2007 having a total electricity generation capacity of 310 MW.

See also

 List of power stations in Romania

References

Coal-fired power stations in Romania